Sivert Heltne Nilsen (born 2 October 1991) is a Norwegian footballer who currently plays as a midfielder for SK Brann. He has previously played for Hødd, Vålerenga, Brann, Horsens, Elfsborg and Waasland-Beveren and has represented his country at youth level.

Club career
Heltne Nilsen started his professional career in Hødd. He started the 2012 Norwegian Football Cup Final, playing the full match and scoring in the penalty shootout to help his team win its first cup title.

In January 2014, Heltne Nilsen moved to Vålerenga. He went to SK Brann in July 2015.

In July 2018, Heltne Nilsen moved to Danish Superligaen side AC Horsens. He signed a five-year contract with the club. On 14 August 2019, he was sold to Swedish club IF Elfsborg.

Career statistics

Honours 
Hødd
 Norwegian Cup: 2012

References

External links

1991 births
Living people
Footballers from Bergen
Norwegian expatriate footballers
Norwegian footballers
IL Hødd players
Vålerenga Fotball players
SK Brann players
AC Horsens players
IF Elfsborg players
Eliteserien players
Norwegian First Division players
Norwegian Second Division players
Danish Superliga players
Allsvenskan players
Norwegian expatriate sportspeople in Denmark
Norwegian expatriate sportspeople in Sweden
Expatriate men's footballers in Denmark
Expatriate footballers in Sweden

Association football midfielders